Gavin Lowe (born 1 March 1995 in Carluke) is a Scottish international 7s rugby union player at the Full Back position.

Rugby union career

Amateur career

Lowe first played his rugby for Ayr Rugby but moved on to the Glasgow Hawks. He was confirmed as part of SportScotland's academy system in 2013.

Lowe has been drafted to Marr in the Scottish Premiership for the 2017-18 season.

Professional career

Lowe secured an Elite Development Programme position at the Glasgow Warriors in 2013 and in 2014. This meant he could continue playing for Glasgow Hawks whilst training and challenging for a place at the Warriors.

He played for Glasgow Warriors in their match against Aberdeen GSFP on 8 August 2013, scoring a try in the match.

After 2 seasons with the Warriors, he was released in 2015.

On 23 June 2021 it was announced that he had been signed by the Ayrshire Bulls to play in the Super 6.

International career

Lowe is now a regular in the Scotland 7s side.

References

External links 
 
 Scottish Rugby biography
 Glasgow Warriors biography

1995 births
Living people
Scottish rugby union players
Glasgow Warriors players
Glasgow Hawks players
Ayr RFC players
Scotland international rugby sevens players
Cumnock RFC players
Marr RFC players
Male rugby sevens players
Rugby union players from South Lanarkshire